
Year 405 BC was a year of the pre-Julian Roman calendar. At the time, it was known as the Year of the Tribunate of Barbatus, Capitolinus, Cincinnatus, Medullinus, Iullus and Mamercinus (or, less frequently, year 349 Ab urbe condita). The denomination 405 BC for this year has been used since the early medieval period, when the Anno Domini calendar era became the prevalent method in Europe for naming years.

Events 
 By place 

 Greece 
 After their victory in the Battle of Arginusae over the Spartans, the Athenian fleet follows the reappointed Spartan admiral, Lysander, to the Hellespont. The Athenian fleet under Admiral Conon is destroyed by the Spartans under Lysander in the Battle of Aegospotami in the Sea of Marmara and Conon flees to Cyprus.
 The Spartan king Pausanias lays siege to Athens while Lysander's fleet blockades Piraeus. This action closes the grain route through the Hellespont, thereby starving Athens.
 While the Peloponnesians besiege Athens, Theramenes tries to negotiate with Lysander. He is away for three months while Athens is being reduced to starvation. Then he heads the embassy that negotiates the terms of capitulation to the Spartans.

 Sicily 
 Dionysius the Elder rises to power as the tyrant of Syracuse. He makes peace with the Carthaginian general, Himilco (whose army has been weakened by the plague), and fortifies Syracuse. This treaty leaves Carthage in control of most of Sicily.
 Dionysius the Elder ruthlessly consolidates and expands his power. He builds a wall around Syracuse and fortifies Epipolae. The Greek citizens of Naxos, Catana, and Leontini are removed from their cities; many of them are enslaved and their homes are given to Sicilian and Italian mercenaries. Dionysius prepares his army to fight against Carthage, which now occupies western and southern Sicily.

 By topic 

 Drama 
 January – Aristophanes' play The Frogs is performed.
 March/April – Euripides' The Bacchae and Iphigeneia at Aulis are performed posthumously as part of a tetralogy at the City Dionysia festival and win first prize.

 Art 
 The Erechtheum, which includes The Porch of Maidens (Caryatid Porch), is completed in the Ionian style on the Acropolis in Athens after 16 years of construction.

Births

Deaths 
 Philolaus, Greek mathematician and philosopher (approximate date) (b. c. 480 BC)

References